Sylwester Janiszewski (born 24 January 1988) is a Polish racing cyclist, who currently rides for UCI Continental team .

Janiszewski was suspended for testing positive to Androstenedione after winning the 2012 Memoriał Henryka Łasaka, and was stripped of his win. He won the Coupe des Carpathes the following day, but was allowed to retain the victory.

Major results

2006
 10th Junior race, UCI Cyclo-cross World Championships
2008
 5th Overall Tour du Loir-et-Cher
 7th Memoriał Henryka Łasaka
2009
 5th Prague–Karlovy Vary–Prague
2010
 2nd Szlakiem Grodów Piastowskich Criterium
 6th Puchar Ministra Obrony Narodowej
 7th Tour du Finistère
 7th Tallinn–Tartu GP
 9th Overall Szlakiem Walk Majora Hubala
2011
 8th Puchar Ministra Obrony Narodowej
2012
 1st Coupe des Carpathes
 1st Prologue Dookoła Mazowsza
 1st Stage 4 Bałtyk–Karkonosze Tour
 3rd Road race, National Road Championships
 3rd Memoriał Andrzeja Trochanowskiego

 1st Memoriał Henryka Łasaka
 7th Puchar Ministra Obrony Narodowej

2015
 1st Stage 4 Szlakiem Grodów Piastowskich
 6th Memoriał Romana Siemińskiego
 6th Memoriał Andrzeja Trochanowskiego
2016
 2nd Memoriał Henryka Łasaka
 3rd Road race, National Road Championships
 4th Overall Dookoła Mazowsza
 5th Puchar Ministra Obrony Narodowej
 8th Memoriał Romana Siemińskiego
2017
 1st Stage 4 Bałtyk–Karkonosze Tour
 2nd Memoriał Henryka Łasaka
 Visegrad 4 Bicycle Race
2nd GP Czech Republic
3rd Grand Prix Poland
 3rd Overall East Bohemia Tour
 3rd Memorial Grundmanna I Wizowskiego
 3rd Puchar Ministra Obrony Narodowej
 6th Race Horizon Park Classic
 8th Coupe des Carpathes
2018
 1st  Course de Solidarność et des Champions Olympiques
1st  Points classification
1st Stages 1 & 5
 2nd Memoriał Andrzeja Trochanowskiego
 5th Memorial Grundmanna I Wizowskiego
 6th Grand Prix Poland, Visegrad 4 Bicycle Race
 7th Road race, National Road Championships
 7th Minsk Cup
 8th Memoriał Romana Siemińskiego
 9th Overall Okolo Jižních Čech
2019
 1st Memorial Grundmanna I Wizowskiego
 3rd Memoriał Romana Siemińskiego
 4th Overall Course de Solidarność et des Champions Olympiques
 7th Korona Kocich Gór
2020
 1st Stage 4 Belgrade–Banja Luka
 2nd Overall Course de Solidarność et des Champions Olympiques
1st Stage 4
 6th GP Slovakia, Visegrad 4 Bicycle Race

References

External links

1988 births
Living people
Polish male cyclists
Sportspeople from Katowice
20th-century Polish people
21st-century Polish people